Asaveri (asāvēri) is a rāgam in Carnatic music (musical scale of South Indian classical music). It is a janya rāgam (derived scale) from the 8th melakarta scale Hanumatodi. It is a janya scale, as it does not have all the seven swaras (musical notes) in the ascending scale, and has a vakra (zigzag) descending scale.

Asaveri is an ancient rāgam, which is mentioned in the Sangita Ratnakara. Asaveri resembles Komal Asavari and Asa Todi of Hindustani classical music. The Asavari of Hindustani music resembles Natabhairavi of Carnatic music.

Structure and Lakshana 

Asaveri is an asymmetric, bhashaga rāgam (has foreign notes) that does not contain gandharam and nishadam in the ascending scale. It is an audava-vakra-sampurna rāgam (or owdava rāgam, meaning pentatonic ascending scale). Its ārohaṇa-avarohaṇa structure (ascending and descending scale) is as follows:

ārohaṇa : 
avarohaṇa : 

The notes used in this scale are shadjam, shuddha rishabham, shuddha madhyamam, panchamam and shuddha dhaivatam in ascending scale, with kaisiki nishadham, sadharana gandharam and "chatushruti rishabham" included in descending scale. For the details of the notations and terms, see swaras in Carnatic music.

The Anya swarams are Chaturshruti Rishabham * / Shuddha gandharam * and Chaturshruti dhaivatam * / Shuddha nishadam *.In veena, the Anya swarams are played from shuddha gandharam   and shuddha nishadam

Popular compositions
There are many compositions set to Asaveri rāgam. Here are some popular kritis composed in this rāgam.

Mapala velasi, Dasharatha nandana and Rara mayintidaka composed by Tyagaraja
Chandram bhajamanasa and Kumaraswaminam by Muthuswami Dikshitar
Ramachandrulu napai by Bhadrachala Ramadasu
Kadaikkannal by Arunachala Kavi
Saranam saranam by Periyasaamy Thooran

Film Songs

Language:Tamil

Notes

References

Janya ragas